Thomas or Tom Hutchinson may refer to:
 Thomas Hutchinson (MP) (1587–1643), English political figure
 Thomas Hutchinson (scholar) (1698–1769), English scholar
 Thomas Hutchinson (governor) (1711–1780), American Loyalist and colonial governor
 Thomas Leger Hutchinson (1812–1883), intendant (mayor) of Charleston, South Carolina
 Thomas Joseph Hutchinson (1820–1885), Anglo-Irish surgeon, explorer, and writer
 Tom Hutchinson (Scottish footballer) (1872–1933)
 Tom Hutchinson (American football) (1941–2007), American football wide receiver
 Tom Hutchinson (English footballer) (born 1982)
 Tom Hutchinson (English teacher), English teacher and author
 Tom Hutchinson (fl. 2000s), musician formerly with Cyanotic
 Tom Hutchinson (Maryland politician), American politician

See also
Thomas Hutchison (disambiguation)
Tim Hutchinson (disambiguation)